The Oulu Cemetery is a cemetery located in the Intiö district close to the city centre of Oulu, Finland.

The cemetery was inaugurated in 1781 by vicar Carl Henrik Ståhle. After the vicar the cemetery was first known as Ståhleborg, the oldest section is still called with the old name. There are two funeral chapels in the cemetery: the old chapel designed by architect Otto F. Holm was completed in 1923 and is located in the older section. The new chapel designed by architect Seppo Valjus was built in 1972–1973. The crematory is located in the new chapel building.

The cemetery includes a military cemetery section for soldiers fallen in the Second World War. The war graves area with a war memorial was inaugurated in September 1952. The war memorial, The Battle Has Ended, was created by sculptor Oskari Jauhiainen.

Notable interments 
 Otto Karhi (April 17, 1876, Oulu – June 7, 1966, Oulu) 
 Robert Wilhelm Lagerborg (October 28, 1796, Tammela – March 28, 1849, Oulu) 
 Yrjö Mäkelin  (June 1, 1875 Tampere – September 18, 1923)
 Teuvo Pakkala (April 9, 1862, Oulu – May 17, 1925, Kuopio)
 Samuli Paulaharju  (April 14, 1875, Kurikka – February 6, 1944, Oulu)
 Ensio Siilasvuo  (January 1, 1922, Helsinki – January 10, 2003, Espoo) 
 Hjalmar Siilasvuo (March 18, 1892, Helsinki – January 11, 1947, Oulu)
 Maria Silfvan (March 25, 1802, Turku – September 10, 1865, Oulu)
 Mikael Toppelius (August 10, 1734, Oulu – December 27, 1821, Oulu)

References

External links 

Buildings and structures in Oulu
Cemeteries in Finland
Lutheran cemeteries
Tourist attractions in Oulu
Intiö
1781 establishments in Sweden